"Vasile Goldiș" Western University of Arad is a private university located in Arad, Romania.

The spiritual patron of the university is Vasile Goldiș, a prominent Romanian politician, pedagogue, publicist, member of the Romanian Academy and a key figure of the Union of Transylvania with Romania in 1918. Subsequent to the union he was a member of the  Ion I. C. Brătianu, Artur Văitoianu and Alexandru Averescu cabinets and a deputy in the Romanian Parliament. After his withdrawal from politics he dedicated himself to educational and cultural activities. Between 1923 and 1932, he was the president of the ASTRA society.

History

The Vasile Goldiș Western University was founded in 1990 with only two faculties at the time: Law and Marketing, Management and Computer Sciences. Subsequently, to the development of the university new faculties appeared completing the initial two. So in 1991 appeared the Faculty of Dentistry, the Faculty of Medicine in 1992, and the Faculty of Physical Training and Sport in 1993. Nowadays the university has branches in Satu Mare, Baia Mare, Zalău, Marghita, Sebis.
Today, the Western University “Vasile Goldiş” in Arad as a postmodern academic institution, humboldtian type, is a forum of free ideas, a communion of education in the spirit of truth, goodness, beauty, civic, democratic ideals and an emblematic landmark on how to quality assurance.

Through its six faculties, the “Vasile Goldiş” Western University of Arad offers young people open to intellectual training and the act of creation a wide variety of study programs for undergraduate, master's and doctoral university levels, facilitating their training. career, professional fulfillment and social recognition. The institutional development of our University is and will remain a meritorious one, organically connected to the expectations of its spiritual mentor, Vasile Goldiş, the founding members of the local community, the distinguished academic body, students, master students, doctoral students and our postdoctoral fellows.

The prestige enjoyed by the “Vasile Goldiş” Western University of Arad abroad is also proved by the large number of students who came from abroad, to different study programs offered by the faculties. Young people from Italy, France, Morocco, India, Israel, Turkey, Germany, Austria, Algeria, Tunisia, Hungary, Sweden and other parts of the world study medicine in Romanian or in French and English. Also, thanks to the performances so far, our University has become a partner of over 50 prestigious academic institutions in the country and around the world, actively participating in the socio-economic and cultural development of Romania.

The university is a signatory of the 1999 Bologna Process Charter.

Academics
Structure of the VGWU
 Faculty of Law
 Faculty of Economics, Information Technology and Engineering
 Faculty of Medicine
 Faculty of Pharmacy
 Faculty of Dentistry
 Faculty of Humanities, Physical Education and Sport

Other academic structures
Macea University Botanical Garden
 Institute of Life Sciences

VGWU establishes itself on a yearly programme separated in two semesters, fall and spring.

Management
 Coralia A. Cotoraci - rector
 Petru Darau – deputy rector
 Anca Hermenean – deputy rector
 Cristian Bente – deputy rector
 Andrei Anghelina – deputy rector
 Paul Freiman -  president of Senate

Research
The university is organized in 6 faculties . Auxiliary to the academic structure, the university developed a system of supporting structures for research and innovation.

References

External links
 Official website

Universities in Arad, Romania
Medical schools in Romania
Educational institutions established in 1990
1990 establishments in Romania